Jamides cleodus, the white cerulean, is a small butterfly found in India that belongs to the lycaenids or blues family. The species was first described by Cajetan Felder in 1865.

See also
List of butterflies of India
List of butterflies of India (Lycaenidae)

References

External links

 With images.

Jamides
Butterflies of Asia